The Kress Building is a building located in downtown Portland, Oregon, listed on the National Register of Historic Places.

It was built in 1928 for S. H. Kress & Co.  As of 2011, tenants of the building include Nike and Sephora.

Description

The five-story store and office building is located on the northeast corner of SW Fifth Avenue and Morrison Street in the center of Portland's retail district. It was built for S. H. Kress & Co. in 1928 from plans by their corporate architect, E. J. Hoffman.

The steel frame building rests on a concrete foundation. Its exterior is faced entirely with cream colored glazed terra cotta, enhanced with a variety of classically inspired decorative motifs. The roof is flat. The footprint of the building is rectangular; its original 100 square feet was extended to the east by a 50 × 100-foot single story wing in 1953 when an adjoining building was acquired and faced with terra cotta to conform with the rest of the block.

The store's design is in the Commercial style of the Chicago school, with detailing in the Classical vein. It exhibits the retail base including mezzanine level and multiple stories capped with a full classical entablature that are characteristic of Commercial style emporiums. The attic, or parapet wall above the cornice carries the store's title in escutcheons centered on either street face. While the entire scheme is conservative, especially in consideration of its late date, it is a generally well-preserved and well-crafted part of the aggregation of fireproof tall buildings dating from the 1910s and 1920s which distinguishes Portland's central business district.

See also
 National Register of Historic Places listings in Southwest Portland, Oregon

References

External links

1928 establishments in Oregon
Beaux-Arts architecture in Oregon
Chicago school architecture in Oregon
National Register of Historic Places in Portland, Oregon
Office buildings completed in 1928
Portland Historic Landmarks
S. H. Kress & Co.
Southwest Portland, Oregon